Santi Pietro e Paolo d’Agrò is a church in Casalvecchio Siculo, in the Metropolitan City of Messina on Sicily (Italy). It is one of the foremost examples on Sicily of Norman architecture.

History
The church was constructed during the 12th century as part of a Basilian monastery.

Architecture
Its exterior is characterised by its block-like form, but the facade is richly decorated. Inside, the church has the plan of a basilica with three aisles. Two domes rise from the central nave, one above its centre and one above the choir.

The architecture of the church displays influences from a vast variety of sources, and constitutes "a mixed architectural heritage, attributable to Sicily's heterogeneous population,  Muslims, Byzantines, and Normans." The block-like form of the exterior is reminiscent of North European contemporary architecture while the floor plan of the church is similar to the way churches were built in the Byzantine architectural tradition. Its principle of construction at the same time is essentially that of Western European Gothic architecture. In its details and decorations, too, the church exhibits a wealth of influences (e.g. in the use of muqarnas vaulting). For these reasons, the church has been called "one of the most sophisticated and coherent works of architecture to emerge from the Norman rule of the island".

Gallery

See also
 Norman-Arab-Byzantine culture
 History of medieval Arabic and Western European domes

References

External links

Norman architecture in Italy
Churches with Norman architecture
Churches in the metropolitan city of Messina